The 2018 Giro d'Italia was the 101st edition of the Giro d'Italia, one of cycling's Grand Tour races. The race started in Jerusalem on 4 May, with a  individual time trial followed by two additional stages within Israel. After a rest day, there were 18 further stages in Italy before the tour reached the finish in Rome on 27 May.

The race was won by Team Sky's Chris Froome, the first British rider to win the race. In winning, Froome completed a hat-trick of consecutive Grand Tour victories, becoming the first rider since Bernard Hinault to hold all three Grand Tour titles simultaneously. His victory was highlighted by an audacious 80 km solo breakaway to win the mountainous stage 19; attacking the small group of leaders including reigning champion Tom Dumoulin on the Cima Coppi of the 2018 Giro, the graveled climb of the Colle delle Finestre, he continued to extend his lead over the Sestriere and to the summit finish of Bardonecchia and overturned a more than three minute deficit to take both the pink jersey, the Cima Coppi prize and the mountains classification. The solo win, and the simultaneous implosion of long-time race leader Simon Yates, who lost more than 30 minutes on the day having lost contact on the first climb of the day, was described as "one of the most extraordinary days in Giro d'Italia history".

History
The Giro Big Start, touted as one of the most expensive sporting events in Israel's history, was largely financed by Canadian-Israeli mogul Sylvan Adams with the help of Israel's Tourism and Transportation Ministries. The 21-stage race began with a 10-kilometer time trial in Jerusalem, followed by a 167-kilometer race from Haifa to Tel Aviv, and a 229-kilometer race from Beersheba to Eilat. They were the first stages of any Grand Tour event ever that have been held outside Europe.

The 2018 Giro d'Italia Israel start was held to pay tribute to Italian cyclist Gino Bartali, a three-time winner of the Giro d'Italia. Bartali helped rescue hundreds of Italian Jews during the Holocaust and was recognized by Yad Vashem in 2013 as Righteous Among the Nations.

The race was won by 's Chris Froome, who therefore held all three Grand Tour titles simultaneously and became the first British cyclist to win the overall classification in the Giro. Froome crashed during a recon ride ahead of the prologue and lost time consistently over the first two weeks. In the final week, however, he won a stage that ended with the climb of Monte Zoncolan, then took back several minutes on all his rivals in Stage 19 with a ride described as "one for the history books". He ended up defeating the defending champion, Tom Dumoulin, by 46 seconds.

Teams

All 18 UCI WorldTeams were automatically invited and were obliged to attend the race. Four wildcard UCI Professional Continental teams were also selected. Each team started with eight riders (one less than in the previous year).

Lotto–Soudal chose to compete under a different name from the rest of the season: they became Lotto Fix ALL, using the name of a product made by Soudal, their normal sponsor.

The teams entering the race were:

UCI WorldTeams

 
 
 
 
 
 
 
 
 
 
 Lotto Fix ALL
 
 
 
 
 
 
 

UCI Professional Continental teams

Pre-race favorites
The main pre-race favorites were reigning Tour de France and Vuelta a España champion Chris Froome, defending champion Tom Dumoulin and Fabio Aru. Other general classification contenders were Miguel Ángel López, Thibaut Pinot, Wout Poels, Simon Yates and Esteban Chaves (both ), George Bennett, Louis Meintjes, Michael Woods, Davide Formolo, Rohan Dennis and Domenico Pozzovivo.

Sprinters at the Giro included Elia Viviani, Jakub Mareczko, Niccolo Bonifazio, Danny van Poppel, Sacha Modolo, Sam Bennett, Jens Debusschere and Ryan Gibbons.

Route and stages

Classification leadership

In the Giro d'Italia, four different jerseys are awarded. The first and most important is the general classification, calculated by adding each rider's finishing times on each stage. Riders receive time bonuses (10, 6 and 4 seconds respectively) for finishing in the first three places on each stage. Smaller time bonuses are also given to the top three riders at the last intermediate sprint on each stage (3, 2 and 1 seconds respectively). The rider with the lowest cumulative time is awarded the pink jersey, and is considered the winner of the Giro d'Italia.

Additionally, there is a points classification. Riders win points for finishing in the top placings on each stage or by being within the first cyclists to reach intermediate sprint locations along each mass-start stage. Flat stages award more points than mountainous stages, meaning that this classification tends to favour sprinters. The leader of the points classification wore the cyclamen jersey.

There is also a mountains classification, for which points were awarded for reaching the top of a climb before other riders. Each climb was categorised as either first, second, third or fourth-category, with more points available for the more difficult, higher-categorised climbs. For first-category climbs, the top eight riders earned points; on second-category climbs, six riders won points; on third-category climbs, only the top four riders earned points with three on fourth-category climbs. The leadership of the mountains classification was marked by a blue jersey. The Cima Coppi, the race's highest point of elevation, awards more points than the other first-category climbs, with nine riders scoring points. At , the Cima Coppi for the 2018 Giro d'Italia is the Colle delle Finestre.

The fourth jersey represents the young rider classification. This is decided the same way as the general classification, but only riders born after 1 January 1994 are eligible. The winner of the classification is awarded a white jersey. There are also two classifications for teams. In the Trofeo Fast Team classification, the times of the best three cyclists per team on each stage are added up; the leading team is one with the lowest total time. The Trofeo Super Team is a team points classification, with the top 20 riders of each stage earning points for their team.

The first additional award is the intermediate sprint classification. Each road stage has two sprints – the Traguardi Volanti. The first 5 riders across the intermediate sprint lines are awarded points (10, 6, 3, 2 and 1 points respectively); the rider with the most points at the end of the race wins the classification. Another classification – the combativity prize – involves points awarded to the first riders at the stage finishes, at intermediate sprints, and at the summits of categorised climbs. There is also a breakaway award. For this, points are awarded to each rider in any breakaway smaller than 10 riders that escapes for at least . Each rider is awarded a point for each kilometre that the rider was away from the peloton. The rider with the most points at the end of the Giro wins the award. The final classification is a "fair play" ranking for each team. Teams are given penalty points for infringing various rules. These range from half-point penalties, for offences that merit warnings from race officials, to a 2000-point penalty, for a positive doping test. The team that has the lowest points total at the end of the Giro wins the classification.

Final standings

General classification

Points classification

Mountains classification

Young rider classification

General Super Team

References

Citations

Bibliography

External links 

  
Postcard from...Jerusalem: The Giro d’Italia comes to Israel, Financial Times

 
Giro d'Italia
Giro d'Italia
Giro d'Italia
Giro d'Italia by year
Giro d'Italia
Giro d'Italia